Eliana Gaete Lazo (born 14 April 1932) is a retired track and field athlete from Chile. She earned gold medals in women's 80m hurdles at the 1951 and 1955 Pan American Games. She was born in Antofagasta.

References
 Profile 

1932 births
Possibly living people
Athletes (track and field) at the 1951 Pan American Games
Athletes (track and field) at the 1955 Pan American Games
Athletes (track and field) at the 1959 Pan American Games
Athletes (track and field) at the 1963 Pan American Games
Pan American Games gold medalists for Chile
Pan American Games silver medalists for Chile
Pan American Games medalists in athletics (track and field)
Chilean female sprinters
Chilean female hurdlers
People from Antofagasta
Medalists at the 1951 Pan American Games
Medalists at the 1955 Pan American Games
20th-century Chilean women
21st-century Chilean women